Guterson is a surname. Notable people with the surname include:

 Amy Guterson (born 1967), American actress
 David Guterson (born 1956), American novelist

See also
 Gutterson